Oudkarspel is a village in the Dutch province of North Holland. It is located in the municipality of Dijk en Waard, north of Noord-Scharwoude.

History 
The village was first mentioned in 1094 as Aldenkercha. The current name means "old parish". Oudkarspel developed in the 11th century a linear settlement along the dike. In 1607, the village became a heerlijkheid and the manor house Oud-Karspel was built around 1640. The estate was damaged by war in 1799 and demolished in 1808. 

The Dutch Reformed church is a three aisled basilica-like church. The tower without a spire used to date from the 13th century. In 1969, the church was completely destroyed in a fire, and was rebuilt in a basic style.

Oudkarspel was home to 704 people in 1840. It was a separate municipality until 1941, when the new municipality of Langedijk was created. In 2022, it became part of the new municipality of Dijk en Waard.

Gallery

References

Former municipalities of North Holland
Populated places in North Holland
Geography of Dijk en Waard